Suberitidae is a family of sea sponges belonging to the order Suberitida.

Genera
Suberites
Homaxinella
Rhizaxinella
Caulospongia
Pseudospongosorites
Aaptos
...

References

 
Sponge families